Reign of Terror is a demo album by American death metal band Death, released in 1984. An interview of the band's lead vocalist and guitarist Chuck Schuldiner was later re-released in 1985 as “Reign of Terror II” which includes  a set from October 1984.

Along with Death's demo Infernal Death, Reign of Terror "influenced the Death metal scene tremendously", as "their low and guttural nature would become the staple of the genre". Author Ian Christe, in his book Sound of the Beast: The Complete Headbanging History of Heavy Metal, noted that Death's demos "became as heavily shared by tape traders as any well-established act in metal".

Track listing

The fan club version of the demo also features a song titled "Zombie Attack" between "Summoned to Die" and "Witch of Hell".

Personnel
Chuck Schuldiner – guitar
Rick Rozz – guitar
Kam Lee – lead vocals, drums

References

External links
Reign of Terror at ...And Bootlegs for All

Death (metal band) albums
1984 albums
Demo albums
Self-released albums